Singhpur is a village in Chittogarh District of the Indian state of Rajasthan. It is located on the Chittorgarh-Udaipur highway. It have  senior secondary school, girls secondary school and 3 private schools; as well as a post office, hospital, bank and police station.

It comes under Singhpur Panchayath. It belongs to Udaipur Division . It is located 20 km towards west from District headquarters Chittorgarh. 318 km from State capital Jaipur

Singhpur Pin code is 312207 and postal head office is Singhpur (Chittorgarh).

References

Villages in Chittorgarh district